José Ignacio Bugarín Pereira (born 10 March 1968) is a Spanish rower. He and Ibon Urbieta competed in the men's coxed pair event at the 1992 Summer Olympics.

References

External links
 

1968 births
Living people
Spanish male rowers
Olympic rowers of Spain
Rowers at the 1992 Summer Olympics
Place of birth missing (living people)